Karen Bliss was born on December 19, 1963 in Lewisburg, Pennsylvania. She is a former American cyclist, four-time U.S. points race champion and a three-time U.S. criterium champion.  On November 2, 2019, in Davis California, she was inducted into the United States Bicycling Hall of Fame in the category Modern Road & Track Competitor.

Early life and career
Karen Bliss was born in Lewisburg, PA, and grew up in Quakertown, Pennsylvania. She competed for 10 years in swimming leagues. Bliss attended Quakertown High School where she played field hockey. and graduated from the Pennsylvania State University in 1985 where she joined a cycling club. She began her career as the "sprint specialist" in small road and criterium races. She graduated from the University of Florida with a master's degree in 1997. She is married to Robert Jellen.

Retirement
In 1998, Karen Bliss retired from cycling after winning over 300 races. Karen Bliss went on to work in the bicycle industry. She was the Chief Marketing Officer and then President of Advanced Sports Enterprises, the company that owned the Fuji bicycle brand which was her first bike sponsor.

References

1963 births
Living people
American female cyclists
People from Lewisburg, Pennsylvania
Sportspeople from Pennsylvania
Pennsylvania State University alumni
21st-century American women